Elyasan (also Romanized as Elyāsān; also known as Elyāsān-e ‘Olyā) is a village in Satar Rural District, Kolyai District, Sonqor County, Kermanshah Province, Iran. At the 2006 census, its population was 76, in 22 families.

References 

Populated places in Sonqor County